"Inhale Positivity" is the third single from the Lazyboy musical project (known as Lazy B in the UK), released as the follow-up to the hit "Underwear Goes Inside the Pants".  It features spiritual and sensual self-help advice spoken by the iconic tones of the late Patrick Allen (a renowned voice over artist and actor), set to sunny club-friendly dance music and a vocoded chorus repeating the mantra "Inhale positivity, exhale negativity".  However the song did not follow up on the success of the previous single and failed to chart.

The B-side, "Spread the Love", contains outtakes from Greg Giraldo's stand-up routine on "Underwear Goes Inside the Pants" set to the music of "The Manual (Chapter 4)".  It will also be included as a bonus track in the 2006 UK release of LazyB TV.

Track listing
 "Inhale Positivity"
 "Spread the Love"
 "Man/Woman (Yin & Yang)

Charts

References

2004 singles
Lazyboy (musical project) songs
2004 songs
Universal Music Group singles
Songs written by Søren Rasted